"Why Not Me" is a 1980 single by Fred Knoblock.  The song was written by Knoblock along with Carson Whitsett.  The song is sung from the point of view of a man attending the wedding of his former girlfriend and sadly wondering why he's not in the groom's position.

"Why Not Me" was a successful release on the Adult Contemporary chart reaching the number one spot.  The single spent two weeks at number one and peaked at number eighteen on the Billboard Hot 100.  "Why Not Me" also peaked at number thirty on the country chart.

Chart performance

References

1980 singles
Fred Knoblock songs
Songs written by J. Fred Knobloch
Songs written by Carson Whitsett
1980 songs